Trujillo Province is one of twelve provinces in La Libertad Region in Peru.

Boundaries 
It borders to the north with the Ascope Province, to the east with the Otuzco Province, to the south with the Virú Province, and to the west with the Pacific Ocean.

Political division 
Nine of these are part of Trujillo's city metropolitan area. The districts of the province are:

 Trujillo
 El Porvenir
 Florencia de Mora
 Huanchaco
 La Esperanza
 Laredo
 Moche
 Poroto
 Salaverry
 Simbal
 Víctor Larco Herrera

Capital 
The capital of the province is the city of Trujillo, the third largest in the country.

Population by districts
The next table shows the population by districts and some complementary data.

See also 
Trujillo city
Víctor Larco city
Virú Province
Ascope Province
Otuzco Province
Trujillo metropolitan area

References

External links
Location of Trujillo city, the capital of the province (Wikimapia)

Provinces of the La Libertad Region